Tell Balgeary, Balgury Is Dead is an EP released in 2003 by Ted Leo and the Pharmacists, although it mostly comprises Ted Leo's solo work.  The title track is carried over from the band's previous album, Hearts of Oak, as is "The High Party" (re recorded as a solo version this time around).  "Bleeding Powers" and "Loyal to My Sorrowful Country" are given full band treatment on 2004's Shake the Sheets and 2005's Sharkbite Sessions, respectively.

Leo includes three (solo) covers on this album — tributes to those who influenced his musical stylings. This styling of "Dirty Old Town" was made famous by The Pogues, while "Ghosts" and "Six Months in a Leaky Boat" were created by The Jam and Split Enz, respectively.  "Six Months in a Leaky Boat" also receives the full band treatment on Sharkbite Sessions.

Lastly, the album includes two tracks — "[Decaying Artifact]" and "Untitled (Space Echo)" — that are reminiscent of the tej leo(?), Rx / pharmacists album.  The latter is a hidden track, not listed on the packaging or in the liner notes. Many fans believe that "[Decaying Artifact]" was reserved for a cover of Bruce Springsteen's "Dancing in the Dark," a live favorite of the Pharmacists, but that Springsteen asked for more money than the other three covers combined. Instead of removing the track, Leo just reverted to his experimental style so that "Ghosts" and "Six Months in a Leaky Boat" could remain separate.

In 2004, "Six Months in a Leaky Boat" was featured on the compilation album "Take Action! Vol. 4". It is the only currently known cover on the album.

The title Tell Balgeary, Balgury Is Dead and the lyrics of the title track are a reference to an Irish version of an old folk story called "The King of the Cats".

Track listing
"Tell Balgeary, Balgury Is Dead"
"The High Party" (solo)
"The Sword in the Stone"
"Bleeding Powers"
"Dirty Old Town"
"Ghosts"
"Decaying Artifact"
"Six Months in a Leaky Boat"
"Loyal to My Sorrowful Country"
"Untitled (Space Echo)"

Personnel 
Ted Leo – vocals, guitar
Dave Lerner – bass
Chris Wilson – drums

References

Ted Leo and the Pharmacists albums
2003 EPs